Mohammed Al-Buainain is a Bahraini politician, engineer, and pilot. He was sworn into the Council of Representatives on December 12, 2018 for the eighth district in the Southern Governorate.

Education
He obtained a degree in aviation sciences from Khalifa bin Zayed Air College in the United Arab Emirates in 1986, then earned a degree in Structural Engineering from the University of Bahrain in 1992, a Bachelor of Science in Civil Engineering from the same school in 1998, and a Master of Science in Engineering Project Management in the United Kingdom in 2000.

Career	
He worked as a civil engineer in the southern municipalities and went on to work for the government of the Southern Governorate.

House of Representatives
In 2018, he decided to run for the eighth district in the Southern Governorate, winning 3,984 votes (63.28%) in the first round.

References

People from Muharraq
Bahraini engineers
Bahraini politicians
Year of birth missing (living people)
Living people